"Blue Monday" is a song by the English rock band New Order. It was released as a 12-inch single on 7 March 1983 through Factory Records. It appears on certain cassette and CD versions of New Order's second album, Power, Corruption & Lies (1983). The track was written and produced by Gillian Gilbert, Peter Hook, Stephen Morris and Bernard Sumner.

"Blue Monday" is a synth-pop and alternative dance song that drew inspirations from many works of other artists. The 12-inch single was backed with a primarily instrumental version of the song entitled "The Beach" on the B-side. The single's unique packaging was designed by Peter Saville and Brett Wickens. It features a die-cut sleeve designed to resemble a -inch floppy disk. The cover features no words, but instead has code in the form of coloured blocks that contains the artist, song and label information.

The original single made the top 10 in many countries. It reached number nine on the UK Singles Chart and spent 38 weeks in the top 75. It spent 186 weeks on the UK Independent Singles Chart, effectively selling for four years until the Substance 1987 compilation on which it featured. The UK Indie Chart run was second only to "Love Will Tear Us Apart" by Joy Division, which clocked 195 weeks (their runs overlapped). In New Zealand, it peaked at number 2 and spent 74 weeks (spread across three calendar years) in the top 50. The 1988 remix reached number 3 on the British chart and number 4 on the Australian chart, and it topped the dance chart in the United States.

"Blue Monday" is the best-selling 12-inch single of all time. In the United Kingdom, it has sold 1.16 million copies in all formats, including the 1988 and 1995 re-releases. Sales of the original 1983 12-inch release account for the bulk of the total, at over 700,000 copies. According to Acclaimed Music, "New Order" is the 42nd-most acclaimed song. It was remixed by the band twice, in 1988 and 1995. The 1988 remix reached number 1 in New Zealand and the top 10 in other countries. The song has been covered by bands including Orgy, Flunk, 808 State, the Enemy and Health. In 2021, Rolling Stone included it at number 235 on its list of the "500 Greatest Songs of All Time".

Background and writing 
New Order was formed in 1980 by the former members of Joy Division, which split after the death of their singer, Ian Curtis. They later recruited Gillian Gilbert as keyboardist and second guitarist, and began to explore new musical technology such as synthesisers.

New Order wrote "Blue Monday" in their rehearsal room in Cheetham Hill, Manchester. The synth bassline was performed on a Moog Source and sequenced on a sequencer built by the singer, Bernard Sumner. A Oberheim DMX drum machine was used for rhythm. The kick drum was recorded playing through a studio monitor to capture the room's natural reverb. New Order bought an early sampler, the Emulator 1, and sampled choir sounds from Kraftwerk's "Uranium". Sumner and the drummer, Stephen Morris, learnt how to use the sampler by spending hours recording their flatulence.

New Order worked before the advent of MIDI, and so enlisted the engineer Martin Usher to design a circuit to synchronise the synthesisers and drum machine. Usher introduced them to the DMX drum machine, which had outputs that could be sent to the other instruments. The sequence was programmed using binary code. Gilbert wrote the sequence out by hand on a long roll of paper, and accidentally added an extra rest, throwing the sequence slightly out of time; the band liked the effect and kept it in the song. New Order also reused some elements from their 1982 composition "Video 5 8 6".

The bassist, Peter Hook, cited Kraftwerk, Giorgio Moroder and Sparks as influences, and said the song was "stolen" from the Donna Summer song "Our Love". Sumner said parts were taken from "Dirty Talk" by Klein + MBO and "You Make Me Feel (Mighty Real)" by Sylvester. Gilbert said Hook's bassline came from a film soundtrack by Ennio Morricone.

Composition

"Blue Monday" has been labelled a "synth-pop classic" and described as cementing the group's movement from post-punk to alternative dance. It has been noted as an example of the hi-NRG style of club music.

The song begins with a semiquaver kick drum, followed by a sequenced melody. The verse features a throbbing synth bassline, bass guitar and deadpan lyrics. 

"Blue Monday" does not feature a standard verse-chorus structure. After a lengthy introduction, the first and second verses are contiguous and are separated from the third verse only by a brief series of sound effects. A short breakdown follows the third verse, which leads to an extended outro. 

"Blue Monday" was described by the BBC Radio 2 "Sold on Song" feature as "a crucial link between Seventies disco and the dance/house boom that took off at the end of the Eighties." Synth-pop had been a major force in British popular music for several years, but "Blue Monday", with encouragement by the band's manager Rob Gretton, was a dance record that also exhibited influences from the New York club scene.

Packaging
The 1983 edition artwork is designed to resemble a  inch floppy disk. The sleeve does not display either the group name or song title in plain English anywhere; the only text on the sleeve is "FAC SEVENTY THREE" on the spine. Instead the legend "FAC 73 BLUE MONDAY AND THE BEACH NEW ORDER" is represented in code by a series of coloured blocks. The key enabling this to be deciphered was printed on the back sleeve of the album, Power, Corruption & Lies. "Blue Monday" and Power, Corruption & Lies are two of four Factory releases from this time period to employ the colour code, the others being "Confusion" by New Order and From the Hip by Section 25.

The single's original sleeve, created by Factory designer Peter Saville and Brett Wickens, was die-cut with a silver inner sleeve. It cost so much to produce that Factory Records actually lost money on each copy sold. Matthew Robertson's Factory Records: The Complete Graphic Album notes that "[d]ue to the use of die-cutting and specified colours, the production cost of this sleeve was so high that the single sold at a loss." Tony Wilson noted that it lost 5p per sleeve "due to our strange accounting system"; Saville noted that nobody expected "Blue Monday" to be a commercially successful record at all, so nobody expected the cost to be an issue." In Shadowplayers: The Rise and Fall of Factory Records, Saville states "I am so bored with this story. We didn't even know how many of these expensive covers were ever made anyway."

Robertson also noted that "later reissues had subtle changes to limit the cost" (the diecut areas being replaced with printed silver ink). Saville commented in 2013 that the printers "banged out a cheaper version. I don't know how many thousands were sold [the original] way, or whether Factory were charged the full price for something they didn't get, which would be very Factory." Peter Saville Associates charged Factory £538.20 for the sleeve design. The artwork was so late that Saville sent it straight to the printer, unreviewed by either the band or the label. The 1988 and 1995 versions were packaged in conventional sleeves.

Music videos
A music video for a shortened version of the original song was created in 1983, featuring military clips with false colour, simple computer-generated graphics such as colour blocks and geometric lines, digitised video of band members at very low resolution and framerate, a brief amount of footage taken from Close Encounters of the Third Kind, and a short appearance of the video game Zaxxon. The colour blocks were created using Peter Saville's colour-coded alphabet.

The music video for "Blue Monday '88" appears on the Substance video collection (released as a companion to the album of the same name). The video features sketches by photographer William Wegman and his Weimaraner dog named Fay Ray doing balancing acts intercut with hand-drawn animation by Robert Breer. The band members are shown standing around doing various tasks, such as walking a wooden plank over a floor that is painted blue, holding wire-mesh constructed art and milk crates over their faces, being hit by tennis balls, and standing still while they flip through various flip books (tying into the hand-drawn animation sequences).

In September 2012, New Order headlined a festival at Portmeirion in North Wales and festival organisers recruited the support of the local Brythoniaid Male Voice Choir to produce a cover version and accompanying video.

Legacy
In 2022, "Blue Monday" was included in the list "The story of NME in 70 (mostly) seminal songs", at number 21: Mark Beaumont wrote that with this song, "Britain's formative alternative dance culture found its way" in the mainstream and "stayed there until the acid house explosion obliterated clubland". In 2021, Rolling Stone included it at number 235 on its list of the "500 Greatest Songs of All Time". It is ranked by Acclaimed Music as the 42nd-most acclaimed song. It has been covered by bands including Orgy, Flunk, 808 State, the Enemy and Health.

Releases

"Blue Monday" has been a hit several times in the UK. In 1983, it charted twice, initially reaching number 12, then re-entering the chart later in the year and climbing to number 9, helped by the fact that neither side of the single (the B-side "The Beach" was an instrumental re-working of "Blue Monday", whose lyrics include the line "I thought I told you to leave me when I walked down to the beach") was featured on the UK version of the group's subsequent album, Power, Corruption & Lies. Despite selling well it was not eligible for an official gold disc because Factory Records was not a member of the British Phonographic Industry association. According to the Official Charts Company, its total sales stand at 1.16 million in the United Kingdom alone, and "Blue Monday" came 69th in the all-time UK best-selling singles chart published in November 2012.

New Order appeared on the BBC's Top of the Pops, on 31 March 1983, to promote the song. New Order insisted on performing "Blue Monday" live. The performance was dogged by technical problems, and was unrepresentative of the recording. In the words of Morris, "Blue Monday was never the easiest song to perform, anyway, and everything went wrong. The synthesisers went awry. It sounded awful." 

In 1985, "Blue Monday" and "Thieves Like Us" were released in Poland as a 7" single in a different sleeve by Tonpress under license from Factory Records and sold over 50,000 copies and reached number 5 on the year-end single chart.

Alternative versions 
In the mid-80s, New Order accepted $200,000 USD to use "Blue Monday" in a commercial for the soft drink Sunkist, with new lyrics: "How does it feel / When a new day has begun? / When you're drinking in the sunshine/ Sunkist is the one".

In 1988, "Blue Monday" was remixed by Quincy Jones and John Potoker as "Blue Monday 1988". Jones was the owner of Qwest Records, New Order's record label in the United States. The single reached number 3 on the British chart, number 4 on the Australian chart, and topped the dance chart in the United States. 

A 1995 reissue, with a mix by Hardfloor as the lead track, also made the UK top 20. The song has sold 1.21 million copies in the UK as of October 2015.

Compilations 
The single was not originally on Power, Corruption & Lies, but was included on the Gap Records Australia/New Zealand cassette version (though listed only on the cassette itself, not on the card) and the 1986 Qwest Records US CD version.

In 2008, Collector's Editions of all New Order's 1980s albums were released, with remastered versions of the original 12" "Blue Monday" and its B-side "The Beach" appearing on the Collector's Edition of Power, Corruption & Lies. Meanwhile, two versions of "Blue Monday '88" appear on the Collector's Edition of 1986's Brotherhood.

1987: Substance 1987 – Original 12" version
1994: Best of New Order – 1988 7" version
1995: Rest of New Order – Hardfloor Mix [note: some versions come with a disc of "Blue Monday" remixes]
2002: International – Original 12" version
2002: Retro – Original 12" version and Jam and Spoon Manuela Mix
2005: Singles – Original 12" version [note: this version omits the opening seconds] and 1988 7" version
2011: Total - Original 12" version
2016: Singles (2016 re-release) - Original 12" version and 1988 7" version

Compilation appearances include

1996 The Best...Album in the World...Ever! - New edited version of 12" mix (runs at 6:45 length)
2001 Mixmag B!g Tunes - Original 12" version
2002 Electric Dreams - Original 12" version
2008 Anthems II 1991-2009 - 1988 7" mix (mixed into "Chime" by Orbital)
2011 Arkives - Plastikman Remix
2021 NOW Yearbook 1983 - Original 12" version

Track listing
All tracks written by Gillian Gilbert, Peter Hook, Stephen Morris and Bernard Sumner.

Blue Monday

Blue Monday 1988

Blue Monday-95

Personnel
New Order
 Bernard Sumner – vocals, keyboards, programming
 Peter Hook – 6-string bass, electronic percussion
 Stephen Morris – keyboards, programming
 Gillian Gilbert – keyboards, programming
Technical
 New Order – production
 Michael Johnson – engineering
 Barry Sage and Mark Boyne – assistants

Charts

Weekly charts

"Blue Monday"

"Blue Monday 1988"

"Blue Monday-95"

Year-end charts

"Blue Monday"

"Blue Monday 1988"

Certifications

Cover versions

Orgy versions

"Blue Monday" was covered by American alternative metal band Orgy. It was released on 14 December 1998. Internationally, the song was a hit, appearing on music charts worldwide. It has been attributed with providing industrial and metal music with a fresh connection.

Background
In an interview with Billboard guitarist Amir Derakh said that upon working on the song they "wanted to do the original 'Blue Monday' justice" and had expected more criticism. He went on to say that they felt lucky to have covered it and that they felt it could have been something that they had written. The fact that their first major hit was a cover of the 1980s electronica/dance song did not bother the band.

Their first official single release featured various versions of "Blue Monday" and upon the success of the song the band decided to include their previous single "Stitches" on the second release. With the label's support this release was an enhanced CD that featured the music video for "Blue Monday" on 9 February 1999, which was in QuickTime format. "Blue Monday" has been made into several dance remixes, some which were produced to appeal to the underground dance club scene, and was even advertised under "Club Mix" 2000, a popular dance compilation series.

The music video for "Blue Monday" also appeared on several music television stations, and the song was also released on vinyl.

Success
The song appeared on modern rock radio stations, and was a hit on MTV; it appeared on MTV's alternative music program 120 minutes and TRL, in which it debuted at number eight on 22 February 1999. The song was perceived as the band's gateway to success, allowing them to tour in Ozzfest. and in the Family Values Tour and led to the rerelease of the song "Stitches". The song appeared in Spin magazine's "Hits of the Year" for 1999. "Blue Monday" is also said to have helped pave the way for the cyberpunk trend, as best exemplified in the popularity of the 1999 science fiction film The Matrix, which appeared soon afterwards.  In an interview of Joel Gallen in Los Angeles magazine, the music supervisors were discussing the use of Orgy's "Blue Monday" for a football scene in Not Another Teen Movie (2001), among others. Stating that the song "had energy", they eventually selected it for the movie, and it appeared in the soundtrack as well.

"Blue Monday" charted internationally, some of which included CMJ's "Commercial Alternative Cuts" and Billboard's Alternative, Pop, and Dance song charts as well as others. It also appeared in Time and Newsweek in 2000 as featured song clips.

Reception

Orgy's "Blue Monday" has been called the "aggro-fied-for-the-1990s" version of New Order's song, and it is considered to be part of a resurgence of new wave covers in gloomcore, along with Dope's cover of Dead or Alive's "You Spin Me Round (Like a Record)". Many critics attribute the success of the album Candyass to "Blue Monday", and some anticipated that Orgy would become a one-hit wonder, believing that it would be difficult for the band to follow up with another hit song. Many believed it to be their best song. Porter W. Richards of Sputnik felt that even though many of the songs off of Candyass sounded similar, "Blue Monday" was a great song that should not be overlooked. While the New Order song is viewed positively by the author of the comic book series Blue Monday, Chynna Clugston, in an interview she expresses dislike for the misconception that she borrowed the title for her book from Orgy's cover version rather than the original.

In a January 2000 Spin interview, Buckcherry's vocalist Josh Todd and guitarist Keith Nelson did not speak highly of the song, likening its sound to a Nine Inch Nails rip-off and calling the sound "mechanical".

Track listing

Information on Blue Monday (single).

Information on "Blue Monday" and "Stitches".

Weekly charts

Year-end charts

Flunk version

Flunk covered the song and released it as a single in 2002. In this version, Flunk slows down "Blue Monday", making it a popular hit for Flunk, based in part on the song's wide recognition. The lyrics become the focus for this version rather than the danceable beat (which was emphasized in the original version). The single received generally positive reviews by electronic music critics, but Mallory O'Donnell of Stylus Magazine commented that Flunk "only showed the paucity of melody" of the original New Order song. The song was subsequently remixed, with at least 7 remixes along with the original version available. The original release was on the 2002 EP titled Blue Monday.

Appearances
Walking Tall (2004)
Nancy Drew (2007)

2002 EP track listing
 "Blue Monday"
 "Eight Days a Freak"
 "Blue Monday" (Howard Maple Mess Up Mix)

Notes

References

Sources

External links
New Order discography (includes images of sleeve)
How we made: New Order's Gillian Gilbert and designer Peter Saville on Blue Monday

1983 songs
1983 singles
1985 singles
1988 singles
1995 singles
1998 singles
1999 singles
British synth-pop songs
Hi-NRG songs
Music videos directed by Gregory Dark
New Order (band) songs
Orgy (band) songs
Song recordings produced by Josh Abraham
Songs written by Bernard Sumner
Songs written by Gillian Gilbert
Songs written by Peter Hook
Songs written by Stephen Morris (musician)
Factory Records singles
London Records singles
Warner Records singles
Reprise Records singles
1982 songs
UK Independent Singles Chart number-one singles
Number-one singles in New Zealand